The women's 200 metre backstroke competition at the 2014 Pan Pacific Swimming Championships took place on August 23 at the Gold Coast Aquatic Centre.  The last champion was Elizabeth Beisel of United States.

This race consisted of four lengths of the pool, all in backstroke.

Records
Prior to this competition, the existing world and Pan Pacific records were as follows:

Results
All times are in minutes and seconds.

Heats
The first round was held on August 23, at 11:24.

B Final 
The B final was held on August 23, at 20:36.

A Final 
The A final was held on August 23, at 20:36.

References

2014 Pan Pacific Swimming Championships
2014 in women's swimming